The 1980 Queensland state election was held on 29 November 1980.

Retiring Members

Labor
Jack Houston MLA (Bulimba)

National
Roy Armstrong MLA (Mulgrave)
Ron Camm MLA (Whitsunday)
Nev Hewitt MLA (Auburn)
Tom Newbery MLA (Mirani)

Liberal
Fred Campbell MLA (Aspley)
Charles Porter MLA (Toowong)

Candidates
Sitting members at the time of the election are shown in bold text.

See also
 1980 Queensland state election
 Members of the Queensland Legislative Assembly, 1977–1980
 Members of the Queensland Legislative Assembly, 1980–1983
 List of political parties in Australia

References
 

Candidates for Queensland state elections